KLLN (90.9 FM) is a radio station licensed to serve the community of Newark, Arkansas. The station is owned by the Cedar Ridge School District.

The station was assigned the KLLN call letters by the Federal Communications Commission on June 13, 1983.

References

External links
 Official Website
 

LLN
Radio stations established in 1986
1986 establishments in Arkansas
High school radio stations in the United States
Independence County, Arkansas